Events from the year 1868 in France.

Incumbents
 Monarch – Napoleon III

Events
March - Geologist Louis Lartet discovers the first identified skeletons of Cro-Magnon, the first anatomically modern humans (early Homo sapiens sapiens), at Abri de Crô-Magnon, a rock shelter at Les Eyzies in the Dordogne.
18 August - The element later named as helium is first detected in the spectrum of the Sun's chromosphere by  astronomer Jules Janssen during a total eclipse in Guntur, India, but assumed to be sodium (on 20 October English astronomer Norman Lockyer identifies it).
October - The French military mission to Japan (1867–68) is ordered to leave by Imperial decree.
Jules-Emile Planchon and colleagues propose Phylloxera as the cause of the Great French Wine Blight.
Jean-Martin Charcot describes and names multiple sclerosis.
Louis Arthur Ducos du Hauron patents methods of color photography.
Ernest and Auguste Bollée first patent the Éolienne Bollée wind turbine.

Arts and literature
January - Émile Zola defends his first major novel, Thérèse Raquin (1867), against charges of pornography and corruption of morals. 
Establishment of the Académie Julian, a major art school in Paris that admits women, by Rodolphe Julian.
Aristide Cavaillé-Coll's organ at Notre-Dame de Paris is dedicated.

Sport
The first documented bicycle race is generally held to be a 1,200 m race at the Parc de Saint-Cloud in Paris.

Births

January to June
17 January - Louis Couturat, logician, mathematician, philosopher, and linguist (died 1914)
27 January - Jenny Sacerdote, under birth name Jeanne Adèle Bernard, famous Parisian dressmaker (died 1962)
3 March - Émile Chartier, philosopher, journalist and pacifist (died 1951)
1 April - Edmond Rostand, poet and playwright (died 1918)
28 April - Émile Bernard, painter (died 1941)
6 May - Gaston Leroux, journalist, detective and novelist (died 1927)
18 June - Georges Lacombe, sculptor and painter (died 1916)

July to December
27 July - Eugène Apert, pediatrician (died 1940)
28 July - André Spire, poet, writer, and Zionist activist (died 1966)
6 August - Paul Claudel, poet, dramatist and diplomat (died 1955)
11 August - Théodore Eugène César Ruyssen, historian of philosophy and pacifist (died 1967)
24 October - Alexandra David-Néel, explorer (died 1969)
19 November - Gustave-Auguste Ferrié, radio pioneer and army general (died 1932)
25 December - Eugenie Besserer, actress (died 1934)

Deaths
13 January - Arthur-Marie Le Hir, Biblical scholar and Orientalist (born 1811)
22 January - Étienne Serres, physician and embryologist (born 1786)
8 February - Jacques Camou, general (born 1792)
11 February - Léon Foucault, physicist (born 1819)
22 April - Jean-François Jarjavay, anatomist and surgeon (born 1815)
24 April - Mary Euphrasia Pelletier, Roman Catholic nun (born 1796)
6 May - Louis Marie de la Haye, Vicomte de Cormenin, jurist and political pamphleteer (born 1788)
14 June - Claude Servais Mathias Pouillet, physicist (born 1791)
22 August - Jean-François Barrière, historian (born 1786)
28 August - Antoine Clot, physician (born 1793)
24 December - Adolphe d'Archiac, geologist and paleontologist (born 1802)
December - Pierre Carmouche, playwright (born 1797)

References

1860s in France